Frank Ragnow (born May 17, 1996)  is an American football center for the Detroit Lions of the National Football League (NFL). He played college football at Arkansas, and was selected by the Lions in the first round of the 2018 NFL Draft.

High school career
Ragnow attended Chanhassen High School in Chanhassen, Minnesota. He was rated as the 24th-best offensive tackle in the nation and the No. 3 prospect from Minnesota as a senior. ESPN evaluated him as a four-star athlete. Ragnow ultimately committed to play for the University of Arkansas after receiving offers from schools such as Wisconsin, Vanderbilt, Minnesota, Ohio State, and Florida State. He was also on the track & field team throwing the shot put 57 feet 6¼ inches in the Class AA State Finals, finishing in second place.

College career
Ragnow participated in nine of Arkansas' twelve games as a freshman, playing as a center. He played a role in Arkansas' spot atop the SEC with 0 sacks allowed. As a sophomore, Ragnow started all thirteen of the Razorbacks' games as a right guard, allowing no sacks in the season's last seven games. As a junior, Ragnow started 12 games as the Hogs' center and the other as the right guard, playing more than 900 snaps. He played as the starting center as a senior in 2017.

Professional career

The Detroit Lions selected Ragnow in the first round (20th overall) of the 2018 NFL Draft. Ragnow was the first center drafted in 2018 and was the second interior linemen drafted. Ragnow became the highest drafted center from Arkansas, surpassing Steve Korte who was selected 38th overall during the 1983 NFL Draft.

On May 12, 2018, the Detroit Lions signed Ragnow to a four-year, $11.78 million contract that includes $9.21 million guaranteed and a signing bonus of $6.64 million.

The Detroit Lions immediately moved Ragnow to offensive guard although he had been used chiefly as a center during his collegiate career. The Lions had Graham Glasgow slated to be the starting center after the departure of Travis Swanson. Head coach Matt Patricia named Ragnow the starting left guard to begin the regular season. He started alongside offensive tackles Taylor Decker, Rick Wagner, right guard T. J. Lang, and center Graham Glasgow.

He made his professional regular season debut and first career start during the Detroit Lions’ season-opening 48-17 loss to the New York Jets. He finished the season starting all 16 games at left guard. On December 21, 2020, he was named to the 2021 Pro Bowl.

On April 28, 2021, the Lions exercised the fifth-year option on Ragnow's contract. He signed a four-year contract extension worth $54 million with the Lions on May 7.

On October 6, 2021, Ragnow was placed on injured reserve with a toe injury.

References

External links

Arkansas Razorbacks bio

Detroit Lions bio

1996 births
Living people
American football offensive linemen
Arkansas Razorbacks football players
Detroit Lions players
People from Chanhassen, Minnesota
Players of American football from Minnesota
Sportspeople from the Minneapolis–Saint Paul metropolitan area
National Conference Pro Bowl players